A Wild Ass of a Man is a 1980 Australian film directed by Norman Johnson and starring Max Gillies and Cornelia Frances. It is based on the 1967 novel by Barry Oakley about a school teacher.

References

External links
 A Wild Ass of a Man

1980 television films
1980 films
Australian television films
Films based on Australian novels
1980s English-language films